Mohite is a Maratha clan.

History 
Early mention of the Mohite name is in Shivabharat, a Sanskrit poem from the 17th century. The Mohite at that time served various Deccan sultanates such as the Nizamshahi or the Adilshahi of Bijapur like other Maratha clans such as Bhosale, Ghorpade, More, Shirke etc.
One of Shahaji's wives, Tukabai, came from the Mohite family. Their son, Venkoji, ruled the Maratha kingdom of Tanjore. Tukabai's niece (her brother's daughter), Soyarabai (d. 1680), became the second wife of Shivaji.The famed female maratha warrior Tarabai (1675–1761), the wife of Rajaram, was also from the Mohite clan. With the rise of Shivaji, the Mohite became his trusted generals. In the internecine conflict between members of the Bhosale family after Shivaji's death in 1680, Soyarabai's own brother and army chief Hambirrao Mohite switched sides to support the claims of Sambhaji for the Maratha throne. Bhavanji Mohite was the commander of the Maratha naval base at Malvan in the early years of the 18th century.

In the 18th century, Burhanji Mohite had great influence over his sister's husband, Raghuji Bhosale, the ruler of the Nagpur kingdom. Burhanji's other sister, Sagunabai, was married to Maratha Chhatrapati Shahu

Modern times
A number of Mohite clan members have been at the forefront of politics in the state of Maharashtra. During the period of 1960–1990, route to power in the state was through local institutions, and the cooperative sugar mills. The two Mohite who achieved influence in the state politics through this route were Shankarrao Mohite-Patil and Yashwantrao Mohite. Many members of Shankarao's family have been active in Maharashtra politics. His son, Vijaysinh Mohite–Patil served as the deputy chief minister of Maharashtra in 2004.

Notables 
Hambirao Mohite, Commander in Chief of the Maratha Army and Soyarabai's brother. His descendants dwell in Talbid.
Shankarrao Mohite-Patil -One of the cooperative sugar barons and Congress party legislature. He attracted a lot of notoriety for his daughter's opulent wedding ceremony at the time of severe drought in Maharashtra in the early 1970s. 
Vijaysinh Mohite–Patil (1944-) -Former deputy chief minister of Maharashtra. Son of Shankarrao Mohite-Patil.
Yashwantrao Mohite (1920–2009) - Indian Freedom fighter, activist of Samyukta Maharashtra movement, Cooperative sugar baron, Congress party minister

See also
 Maratha
 Maratha Empire
 Maratha clan system
 List of Maratha dynasties and states
 Bhonsle
 Gaekwad
 Scindia
 Puars
 Holkar
 Peshwa

Footnotes

Sources

Marathi

English
A History of the Mahrattas by James Grant Duff and Stephen Meredyth Edwardes. Revised edition published by H. Milford, Oxford university press, 1921. Item notes: v. 2. Original from Harvard University. Digitized 7 Jul 2005. 573 pages
Elements amongst the Marathas by Vidyanand Swami Shrivastavya. Published by Published by D.K. Shrivastavya for Aitihasik Gaurav Grantha Mala, 1952. Item notes: v. 1. Original from the University of Michigan. Digitized 2 Aug 2007. 228 pages
The rise and fall of the Maratha Empire by Rajaram Vyankatesh Nadkarnia. Published by Popular Prakashan, 1966. Original from the University of Michigan. Digitized 1 Aug 2007. 410 pages
The Mughal-Maratha relations: twenty five fateful years, 1682–1707 by G. T. Kulkarni. Published by the Department of History, Deccan College Post-Graduate Research Institute, 1983. Original from the University of Michigan. Digitized 9 Aug 2007. 285 pages
Lectures on Maratha Mughal relations, 1680–1707 by Setumadhava Rao Pagdi, Nagpur University. Published by Printed at Nagpur Vidyapeeth Mudranalaya, 1966. Original from the University of Michigan. Digitized 11 Jul 2006. 156 pages
The Life and Exploits of Shivāji by Krishnáji Anant and Jagannáth Lakshuman Mánkar. Second edition. Published by s.n., 1886. Original from Oxford University. Digitized 22 Nov 2007. 112 pages
Maharashtra State Gazetteers by Gazetteers Department, Maharashtra (India). Revised edition. Published by Directorate of Govt. Print., Stationery and Publications, Maharashtra State, 1968. Item notes: v. 13. Original from the University of California. Digitized 25 Jan 2008.

Surnames
Maratha clans